Coffin Island is an island that is located in the Great Southern region of Western Australia. With an area of  the island is made up mostly of granite.

Fauna 
Coffin Island forms part of the Two Peoples Bay and Mount Manypeaks Important Bird Area, identified as such by BirdLife International because of its significance in the conservation of several rare and threatened bird species.  The island is recognised as a breeding site for great-winged petrels. Other seabirds such as flesh-footed shearwaters and little penguins also have colonies on the island.  The island also provides haul-out sites for New Zealand fur seals with a population of approximately 100 being recorded on the island in 1990.  Australian sea lions also make use of the island in smaller numbers.

Flora 
The island has sufficient soil accumulated over its surface to support Berry Saltbush heathland.

References

Nature reserves in Western Australia
Islands of the Great Southern (Western Australia)
Important Bird Areas of Western Australia